Yuran may refer to

People
 Sergei Yuran, Russian football manager and former player
 Yuran Fernandes, Cape Verdean professional footballer
 Yuran Nimasha, Sri Lankan cricketer

Places 
 Qater Yuran-e Olya, a village in Iran
 Qater Yuran-e Sofla, a village in Iran

See also
 Uran (disambiguation)
 Yu Rang